Pag (also Romanized as Pāg) is a village in Abreis Rural District, Bazman District, Iranshahr County, Sistan and Baluchestan Province, Iran. At the 2006 census, its population was 218, in 41 families.

References 

Populated places in Iranshahr County